"Nowhere Road" is a song co-written and recorded by American singer-songwriter Steve Earle. It was released in June 1987 as the second single from the album Exit 0. The song reached number 20 on the Billboard Hot Country Singles & Tracks chart.  Earle wrote this song with Reno Kling.

Music video
The music video was directed by Jim Hershleder and premiered in mid-1987.

Chart performance

Covers
"Nowhere Road" was recorded by Waylon Jennings and Willie Nelson for inclusion as a bonus track on the 20th anniversary reissue of their album Wanted! The Outlaws in 1996.

References

1987 singles
Steve Earle songs
Songs written by Steve Earle
Song recordings produced by Tony Brown (record producer)
Song recordings produced by Emory Gordy Jr.
MCA Records singles